The Miami Marlins are a professional baseball team that has played in the National League since the team's founding in 1993. Major League Baseball offers several awards at the end of each season to commemorate the achievement of individual players. The Most Valuable Player award is generally given to the player who had the greatest impact on the success of his team, whether that be in the regular season, the postseason, or the All-Star game. The Cy Young Award is a prize awarded to the pitcher who is perceived to have had the best regular season. The Gold Glove Awards are presented to players who are recognized as being the best at fielding their respective positions during the regular season, while their counterparts the Silver Slugger is awarded to the best hitter at each respective position. The Rookie of the year is presented to the player recognized as the best newcomer to the league, while the Manager of the Year is given to the coach perceived to have had the greatest impact on his team's success.

Awards

Most Valuable Player (NL)

Giancarlo Stanton (2017)

Cy Young Award (NL)

Sandy Alcántara (2022)

Rookie of the Year

Dontrelle Willis (2003)
Hanley Ramírez (2006)
Chris Coghlan (2009)
José Fernández (2013)

Manager of the Year

See footnote
Jack McKeon (2003)
Joe Girardi (2006)
Don Mattingly (2020)

Gold Glove

Charles Johnson, C (1995, 1996, 1997)
Luis Castillo, 2B (2003, 2004, 2005)
Derrek Lee, 1B (2003)
Mike Lowell, 3B (2005)
Mark Buehrle, P (2012)
Christian Yelich, LF (2014)
Dee Gordon, 2B (2015)
Marcell Ozuna, LF (2017)

Silver Slugger

Gary Sheffield, OF (1996)
Mike Lowell, 3B (2003)
Miguel Cabrera, OF/3B (2005, 2006)
Hanley Ramírez, SS (2008, 2009)
Dan Uggla, 2B (2010)
Giancarlo Stanton, OF (2014, 2017)
Dee Gordon, 2B (2015)
Christian Yelich, OF (2016)
Marcell Ozuna, OF (2017)
J. T. Realmuto, C (2018)

Wilson Defensive Player of the Year Award 

See explanatory note at Atlanta Braves award winners and league leaders
Team (at all positions)
Giancarlo Stanton, (2012)
Donovan Solano, (2013)

Second base (in MLB)
Dee Gordon, (2015)

Hank Aaron Award

Giancarlo Stanton, RF (2014, 2017)

MLB Comeback Player of the Year (NL)

Casey McGehee, 3B (2014)
Jose Fernandez, P (2016)

Relief Man of the Year

See footnote
Antonio Alfonseca (2000)

NL All-Stars

World Series MVP

Liván Hernández (1997)
Josh Beckett (2003)

NLCS MVP
See: National League Championship Series
Liván Hernández (1997)
Iván Rodríguez (2003)

All-Star Game MVP

Jeff Conine (1995)

DHL Hometown Heroes (2006)

Dontrelle Willis — voted by MLB fans as the most outstanding player in the history of the franchise, based on on-field performance, leadership quality and character value

Baseball America Manager of the Year
See: Baseball America#Baseball America Manager of the Year
Jack McKeon (2003)
Joe Girardi (2006)

Team award
1997 – Warren C. Giles Trophy (National League champion)
 – Commissioner's Trophy (World Series)
2003 – Warren C. Giles Trophy (National League champion)
 – Commissioner's Trophy (World Series)
 – Baseball America Organization of the Year

Other achievements

National Baseball Hall of Fame
See: Miami Marlins#Baseball Hall of Famers

Retired numbers
See: Miami Marlins#Retired numbers

United States Sports Academy "Carl Maddox Sport Management Award"

1993 – Wayne Huizenga

See also
Baseball awards
List of Major League Baseball awards

Footnotes

Award
Major League Baseball team trophies and awards